HMS Drury was a , originally commissioned to be built for the United States Navy as an . Before she was finished in 1942, she was transferred to the Royal Navy under the terms of Lend-Lease, and saw service during the Second World War.

Wartime career
She was originally to have been named HMS Cockburn, but the name was changed to HMS Drury prior to her launch on 24 July 1942 by the Philadelphia Navy Yard, Philadelphia, Pennsylvania. She was commissioned into the Royal Navy on 12 April 1943 and spent her wartime career on anti-submarine patrols and as a convoy escort.

Post-War return to the United States
Drury was transferred back to the US Navy on 20 August 1945 at Chatham, England. She was commissioned the same day. She departed Chatham on 28 August, joined Task Group 21.3 off Dover, and the following day sailed for the States. Drury arrived at Philadelphia, Pennsylvania, on 8 September and remained there at the Philadelphia Navy Yard where she was decommissioned on 22 October 1945. She was scrapped in June 1946.

References

 
 Drury at Uboat.net
 Drury at Captain class frigate association

External links

 

Captain-class frigates
Evarts-class destroyer escorts
World War II frigates of the United Kingdom
Ships built in Philadelphia
1942 ships